Gallea is an Italian surname. Notable people with the surname include:

 Arturo Gallea (1895–1959), Italian cinematographer and producer
 Cesare Gallea (1917–2008), Italian footballer

Italian-language surnames